The Montenegrin football league system is a series of connected leagues for club football in Montenegro. This system has hierarchical format with promotion and relegation between leagues at different levels.

Present System

    
Montenegro